Nanna Rosha Nooru Varusha (Kannada: ನನ್ನ ರೋಷ ನೂರು ವರುಷ) is a 1980 Indian Kannada film, directed by Joe Simon. The film stars Vishnuvardhan, Padmapriya, Hema Chowdhary, Nagesh and K. S. Ashwath in lead roles. The film had musical score by Chellapilla Satyam.

Cast

Vishnuvardhan as Anand
Padmapriya as Shanthi
Hema Choudhary
K. S. Ashwath
Dinesh
Shakti Prasad
Tiger Prabhakar as Govinda
Chethan Ramarao
Leelavathi
Uma Shivakumar
Shyamala
Shanthamma
Jai Jagadish
Ramakrishna
Rajanand
Anantharam Maccheri
Hanumanthachari
Ashwath Narayan
Thipatur Siddaramaiah

References

External links
 

1980 films
1980s Kannada-language films
Films scored by Satyam (composer)